Pe Ell is a town in Lewis County, Washington, United States. The population was 642 at the 2020 census.

History

Pe Ell was officially incorporated on March 9, 1906.

There have long been several versions of how Pe Ell was named, none of which can be authenticated.
 The more accepted version is that the name comes from the attempts of the local Indians to pronounce the first name of an early French-Canadian settler, Pierre Charles, who was an ex-Hudson's Bay employee. This version has it that the Indians could not pronounce Pierre, and their attempts turned it into Pe Ell.
 Another version is that P and L were the first initials for Pierre Charles and his Indian wife. Two words were made from the initials: "Pe Ell".
 Another distinct version is that Charlie Pershell, a Frenchman, settled in the area and married an Indian woman. The Indians found it difficult to sound out the "sh" in Pershell so it became Pe Ell.
 Another story is the railroad map designated the spot as PL, and that became the name.

In 1897, the North Pacific Railway built a railroad depot in the town. In 1907, Pe Ell's population was around 1,000—larger than it is today. The rich agricultural and timber resources of the region attracted farmers, millworkers, and loggers. By 1909, the town had a bank, three dry goods stores, two general stores, three grocery stores, two barber shops, five saloons, four hotels, a newspaper, a blacksmith, and even an opera house.

Geography
Pe Ell is located at  (46.571415, -123.296842).

Demographics

2010 census
As of the census of 2010, there were 632 people, 259 households, and 169 families living in the town. The racial makeup of the town was 91.3% White, 0.2% African American, 3.2% Native American, 1.7% from other races, and 3.6% from two or more races. Hispanic or Latino of any race were 4.3% of the population.

There were 259 households, of which 32.8% had children under the age of 18 living with them, 49.0% were married couples living together, 10.4% had a female householder with no husband present, 5.8% had a male householder with no wife present, and 34.7% were non-families. 26.6% of all households were made up of individuals, and 12.8% had someone living alone who was 65 years of age or older. The average household size was 2.44 and the average family size was 2.91.

The median age in the town was 40 years. 25% of residents were under the age of 18; 7.2% were between the ages of 18 and 24; 23.4% were from 25 to 44; 26.6% were from 45 to 64; and 17.7% were 65 years of age or older. The gender makeup of the town was 49.7% male and 50.3% female.

2000 census
As of the census of 2000, there were 657 people, 248 households, and 174 families living in the town. The population density was 1,099.7 people per square mile (422.8/km2). There were 289 housing units at an average density of 483.7 per square mile (186.0/km2). The racial makeup of the town was 93.15% White, 0.30% African American, 2.28% Native American, 0.91% Asian, 0.61% Pacific Islander, 1.07% from other races, and 1.67% from two or more races. Hispanic or Latino of any race were 2.28% of the population. 23.5% were of American, 15.1% English, 12.8% German, 9.9% Irish and 8.5% Polish ancestry.

There were 248 households, out of which 33.9% had children under the age of 18 living with them, 54.8% were married couples living together, 8.9% had a female householder with no husband present, and 29.8% were non-families. 23.8% of all households were made up of individuals, and 12.1% had someone living alone who was 65 years of age or older. The average household size was 2.65 and the average family size was 3.17.

In the town, the age distribution of the population shows 30.6% under the age of 18, 7.3% from 18 to 24, 25.9% from 25 to 44, 22.2% from 45 to 64, and 14.0% who were 65 years of age or older. The median age was 34 years. For every 100 females, there were 107.3 males. For every 100 females age 18 and over, there were 103.6 males.

The median income for a household in the town was $27,321, and the median income for a family was $30,625. Males had a median income of $36,875 versus $18,125 for females. The per capita income for the town was $12,481. About 20.0% of families and 22.4% of the population were below the poverty line, including 32.7% of those under age 18 and 10.8% of those age 65 or over.

Parks and recreation
The town is the starting point of the Pe Ell River Run. Begun as a birthday celebration between a local group of young men in 1978, the event consists of entrants buying or building water crafts and floating down the Chehalis River from Pe Ell to Rainbow Falls State Park, where riders can float over a slight waterfall that still remains despite severe flooding damage due to the Great Coastal Gale of 2007.

The Willapa Hills Trail bisects the town.

Government and politics

Politics
Similar to other towns within Lewis County, Pe Ell is recognized as being majority Republican and conservative. 

The results for the 2020 U.S. Presidential Election for the Pe Ell voting district were as follows:

 Donald J. Trump (Republican) - 250 (70.62%)
 Joe Biden (Democrat) - 97 (27.40%)
 Jo Jorgensen (Libertarian) - 4 (1.13%)
 Write-in candidate - 3 (0.85%)

References

External links

Towns in Lewis County, Washington
Towns in Washington (state)